This list of botanical gardens and arboretums in Colorado is intended to include all significant botanical gardens and arboretums in the U.S. state of Colorado

See also
List of botanical gardens and arboretums in the United States

References 

 
Arboreta in Colorado
botanical gardens and arboretums in Colorado